Leading Edge Forum (LEF) helps clients challenge conventional assumptions with original, future-focused thinking.

LEF’s programme of progressive research and thought leadership, next-practice advisory interventions, and immersive events augment clients' capabilities for horizon-scanning and sense-making and helps some of the world’s leading organizations accelerate the business outcomes of technology-enabled change. Leading Edge Forum is a business unit of DXC Technology.

History

The organization traces its roots back to 1988 when CSC acquired the consulting and research firms, Index Group 
in the United States and later the Butler Cox Foundation in the United Kingdom in 1991.

Index Group, founded by Thomas P. Gerrity and others from MIT was perhaps best known for coining the term business re-engineering popularized by the book by James Champy and Michael Hammer, Re-engineering the Corporation.   In collaboration with Michael Treacy, it also helped establish the Value Disciplines approach to business strategy.  
The Butler Cox Foundation founded by David Butler
and George Cox
and created "the most successful membership organisation for CIOs ever initiated in Europe", that would enable senior IT executives to exchange ideas and share experiences, backed by an ongoing research process.

The term, consumerization, was first fully explored by LEF in a position paper in June 2004, first known published paper on this topic. Four years later, in June 2008 the Wikipedia entry for Consumerization was created.

Leadership
As of 2014, the Managing Director is Richard Davies

Press coverage

Leading Edge Forum research has been mentioned by many news institutions including Forbes, The Economist, 
CIO Magazine 
and Wall St Journal.

References

External links
Leading Edge Forum Website

Companies based in the London Borough of Camden
Consulting firms established in 1988
International information technology consulting firms
Research and analysis firms of the United Kingdom
1988 establishments in the United Kingdom
Companies established in 1988